Suberg-Grossaffoltern railway station is a railway station in the municipality of Grossaffoltern, in the Swiss canton of Bern. It is an intermediate stop on the standard gauge Biel/Bienne–Bern line of Swiss Federal Railways.

Services 
The following services stop at Suberg-Grossaffoltern:

References

External links 
 
 

Railway stations in the canton of Bern
Swiss Federal Railways stations